Events in the year 1795 in India.

Events
 National income - 10,952 million
 Trial of Warren Hastings, Governor-General of India, before the House of Lords, 12 Feb. 1788 – 23 Apr. 1795.
The Nizam of Hyderabad defeated at the Battle of Kharda by the Marathas.
Travancore comes under British protection; see Company rule in India

References

 
Years of the 18th century in India